The Eagle is a 1918 American silent Western film directed by Elmer Clifton and starring Monroe Salisbury, Edna Earle and Ward Wing.

Cast
 Monroe Salisbury as John Gregory ('The Eagle')
 Edna Earle as Lucy
 Ward Wing as Bob
 Alfred Allen as Mining company official

References

Bibliography
 James Robert Parish & Michael R. Pitts. Film directors: a guide to their American films. Scarecrow Press, 1974.

External links
 

1918 films
1918 Western (genre) films
1910s English-language films
American black-and-white films
Films directed by Elmer Clifton
Silent American Western (genre) films
Universal Pictures films
1910s American films